Splendrillia armata is a species of sea snail, a marine gastropod mollusk in the family Drilliidae.

Distribution
This marine species is endemic to New Zealand and occurs off North Island.

References

 Powell, Arthur William Baden. The New Zealand Recent and Fossil Mollusca of the Family Turridae: With General Notes on Turrid Nomenclature and Systematics. No. 2. Unity Press limited, printers, 1942.
 Beu, A.G. 1979: Bathyal Nukumaruan mollusca from Oaro, southern Marlborough, New Zealand, New Zealand Journal of Geology and Geophysics, 22(1)
  Tucker, J.K. 2004 Catalog of recent and fossil turrids (Mollusca: Gastropoda). Zootaxa 682:1–1295.
  Spencer H.G., Willan R.C., Marshall B.A. & Murray T.J. (2011). Checklist of the Recent Mollusca Recorded from the New Zealand Exclusive Economic Zone

External links
 

armata
Gastropods of New Zealand
Gastropods described in 1942